Una mattina is a 2004 music album by Italian pianist Ludovico Einaudi.

Background and composition
Einaudi described Una Mattina by saying:

Track listing

Charts

Album

"Una mattina"

Certifications

References

External links
 Ludovico Einaudi's Official website

2004 albums
Ludovico Einaudi albums